Anderson Peak is an 8,683-foot-elevation (2,647 meter) mountain summit in Placer County, California, United States.

Description
It is situated on the crest of the Sierra Nevada mountain range, with precipitation runoff from the peak draining west to North Fork American River and east to the Truckee River via South Fork Cold Creek. The Pacific Crest Trail traverses the peak, providing an approach option from Donner Pass or Palisades Tahoe. The Sierra Club's Benson Hut is set below the north face of the peak. This landform's toponym has been officially adopted by the U.S. Board on Geographic Names.

Climate
According to the Köppen climate classification system, Anderson Peak is located in an alpine climate zone. Most weather fronts originate in the Pacific Ocean and travel east toward the Sierra Nevada mountains. As fronts approach, they are forced upward by the peaks (orographic lift), causing them to drop their moisture in the form of rain or snowfall onto the range.

Gallery

See also

References

External links
 Weather forecast: Anderson Peak
 National Geodetic Survey Data Sheet

North American 2000 m summits
Mountains of Northern California
Tahoe National Forest
Mountains of the Sierra Nevada (United States)
Mountains of Placer County, California